Die Model WG (German for The Model Community) is an Austrian reality television documentary series which follows six former contestants from the first season of Austria's Next Topmodel trying to break through in the modelling business. It debuted on Puls 4 on 4 May 2009. In 2010 German adaptation of the same title resulted from the Austrian Die Model WG.

Overview

The contestants face a competition where they collect photos for their comp card as new faces on Wiener Models for each job they get booked for and perform well in. The contestant who first collects four photos will become the face of the newest BIPA campaign and move to New York City where she will go on to trying to work on her international breakthrough.

In the first episode, Andrea Weidler, judge on Austria's Next Topmodel and agency chef of Wiener Models, invited the finalists from the other show (excluding winner Larissa Marolt) to compete for five places in a Model Loft. Although actually being the first choice, Constanzia Delort-Laval was forced to withdraw because she underperformed in school after her participation on Austria's Next Topmodel] and therefore made room for two more girls to compete when it was revealed that Kim Sade-Tiroch got a wildcard.

Contestants
Birgit Königstorfer, 22 from Linz
Julia Mähder, 20 from Vienna
Kordula Stöckl, 21 from Naviz
Kim Sade-Tiroch, 17 from Baden
Tamara Puljarevic, 18 from Vienna
Victoria Hooper, 16 from Vienna

Weekly performances

 The contestant won the competition
 The contestant received a photo for her sedcard
 The contestant was booked for a job but did not receive a sedcard
 The contestant was asked to leave the competition

Unlike the German format of the show, only 2 episodes featured eliminations.
Episode 5 was the recap episode.
In Episode 7, Julia was absent from judging. Also, one of Kordula's photos was removed from her sedcard and replaced by a new one.

Criticism
The show was accused of being a permanent advertising for its sponsor BIPA where the name of the drug-store-product-line is quite often mentioned as well as for the striking resemblance of its logo to the one of the show.

See also
Austria's Next Topmodel

References

Austria
2009 Austrian television series debuts
2000s Austrian television series
2010s Austrian television series

de:Austria’s Next Topmodel